The men's long jump event at the 2003 European Athletics U23 Championships was held in Bydgoszcz, Poland, at Zawisza Stadion on 19 and 20 July.

Medalists

Results

Final
20 July

Qualifications
19 July
Qualifying 7.80 or 12 best to the Final

Group A

Group B

Participation
According to an unofficial count, 27 athletes from 21 countries participated in the event.

 (1)
 (1)
 (1)
 (3)
 (1)
 (1)
 (1)
 (2)
 (1)
 (1)
 (1)
 (3)
 (1)
 (1)
 (1)
 (1)
 (1)
 (1)
 (1)
 (2)
 (1)

References

Long jump
Long jump at the European Athletics U23 Championships